Warren Guy Brosnihan  (born 28 December 1971) is a South African former rugby union player.

Playing career

Brosnihan made his test debut for the Springboks against  during the 1997 Tri Nations Series at Loftus Versfeld in Pretoria, scoring his first and only test try. His second test match was three years later, during the 2000 Tri Nations Series, against . He played a further four test matches in 2000, all as a replacement and he also played in four tour matches, scoring one further try for the Springboks.

Test history

See also
List of South Africa national rugby union players – Springbok no. 655

References

1971 births
Living people
South African rugby union players
South Africa international rugby union players
Sharks (Currie Cup) players
Sharks (rugby union) players
Golden Lions players
Blue Bulls players
Ulster Rugby players
Alumni of Northwood School, Durban
Rugby union players from the Western Cape
Rugby union flankers
Expatriate rugby union players in Northern Ireland
Expatriate rugby union players in Italy
South African expatriate sportspeople in Northern Ireland
South African expatriate sportspeople in Italy
South African expatriate rugby union players